Red Special is an EP by guitarist Brian May of Queen. The mini-album was a Japan-only release to promote the tour in Japan.

Overview
The EP contains exclusive live tracks by The Brian May Band recorded at the European part of his Another World tour, tracks taken from the Another World album and singles' B-sides.

Track listing
"On My Way Up" (Live in Paris, June 98) (Brian May) – 8:05 
"Why Don't We Try Again" (May) – 5:23
"Maybe Baby" (Buddy Holly, Norman Petty) – 2:11
"Business (USA Radio Mix Uncut)" (May) – 5:10
"Another World" (May) – 4:07
"Only Make Believe" (Conway Twitty, Jack Nance) – 2:38
"Hammer to Fall" (Live in Paris, June 98) (May) – 9:08
"Brian Talks (A Tribute to Cozy Powell)" – 1:13

Personnel
Brian May - vocals, guitars, bass guitar, keyboards, programming
Cozy Powell - drums, percussion
Steve Ferrone - drums, percussion
Ken Taylor - bass guitar
Neil Murray - bass guitar
Jamie Moses - guitar
Spike Edney - keyboards

Personnel on live tracks
Spike Edney - keyboards
Jamie Moses - guitar
Steve Ferrone - drums, cocktail kit
Neil Murray - bass guitar
Susie Webb and Zoe Nicholas - backing vocals

Production
Arrangement and production - Brian May
Engineering and co-production - Justin Shirley-Smith
Additional mixing (live tracks) - David Richards and Neil Amor
Design - Richard Gray
Equipment supervision and maintenance - Peter Malandrone
Mastered by Kevin Metcalfe at The Soundmasters

References

1998 EPs
Brian May albums
EMI Records EPs